The Four States Auto Museum (formerly the Tex-Ark Antique Auto Museum) is an automobile museum in Texarkana, Arkansas. It was established in 2004 and chartered as a 501(c)(3) organization in the State of Arkansas. The museum is located on a site formerly used for wagon and automobile body construction.

The Four States Auto Museum's mission is to "preserve, collect, exhibit, operate, and interpret a collection of antique automobiles" and related archival documents. Its collections span 100 years of automotive history and include over 20 automobiles that are displayed on a rotating basis, generally for periods of three to six months. At any one time, the museum has approximately 15 cars on display, as well as a few motorcycles and a variety of automobilia. Among the highlights of the collection are a Civil War vintage horse-drawn hearse, a Ford Model T and Model A, a Nash Metropolitan, a Studebaker dragster, and a 2015 Chevrolet Corvette. The museum also maintains a collection of automotive-related books, newsletters, and periodicals.

The Four States Auto Museum hosts an annual car show in conjunction with Texarkana's RailFest, as well as the annual Fall Fun Car Show & Swap Meet, both of which serve as fundraisers for it. The museum also hosts various educational events, parties, school tours, and weddings.

Gallery

References

External links 
 
 

Automobile museums in Arkansas
Buildings and structures in Texarkana, Arkansas
Texarkana